= Museum of Insurance, Kraków =

Coordinates: 50.0644328°N 19.9337804°E

Kraków Museum of Insurance
- Muzeum Ubezpieczeń w Krakowie
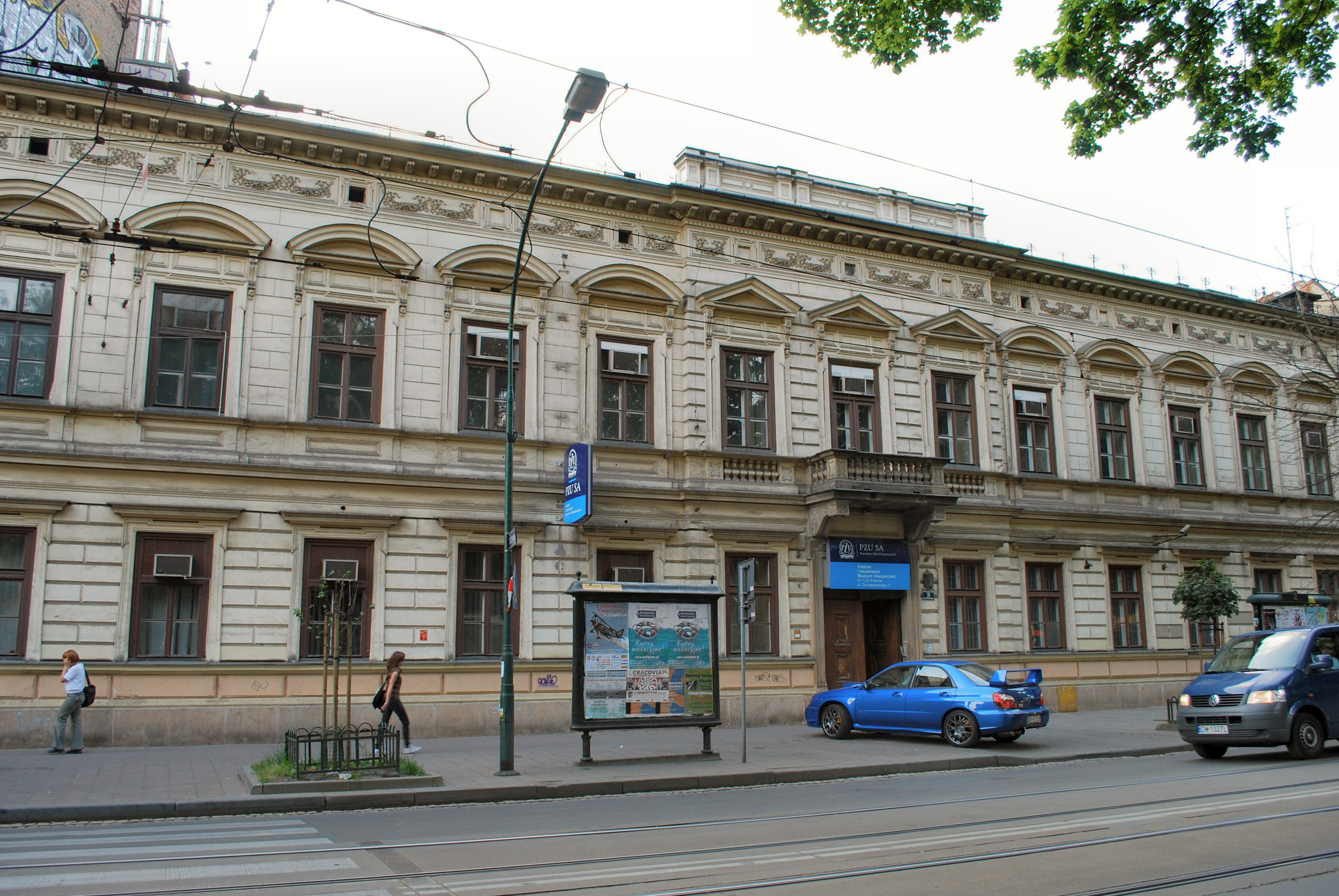
- Museum entrance
- Location: Kraków, Dunajewskiego 3 Street
- Director: Marianna Halota
- Website: Homepage at Wayback

The Kraków Museum of Insurance (Polish: Muzeum Ubezpieczeń w Krakowie) is a former museum in Kraków, Poland which was dedicated to insurances. It was established in 1987. It was the only such museum in existence devoted to all aspects of the history of insurance in Poland and in formerly Polish lands. The director of the museum was Marianna Halota. The collections of the museum encompassed two centuries of rare artifacts and memorabilia including over 35,000 historic documents and certificates from 28 countries.
